Leo Yao Liang (1923 – December 30, 2009) was the Catholic bishop of the Diocese of Ziwanzi, China.

Ordained in 1946, Yao Liang was sentenced to a Chinese Communist labor camp in 1958 and was released in 1984. With the approval of the Vatican, he was ordained bishop on February 19, 2002.

Notes

External links
New York Times: Bishop Yao Liang, 87, Imprisoned in China for Loyalty to the Vatican, Dies 

1923 births
2009 deaths
21st-century Roman Catholic bishops in China